South Island (Malay: Pulau Panjang, Cocos Malay: Pulu Atas) is the southernmost and easternmost island of the Cocos (Keeling) Islands belonging to Australia in the eastern Indian Ocean.

The island belongs to the atoll of the South Keeling Islands. It is uninhabited.

South Island forms the southwestern edge of the atoll, so it is very curved. While the sea side is rather straight, consists of a beach and drops steeply after a few meters, the lagoon side is branched and only drops very gently. The island is heavily forested. Directly to the north are nine smaller islands, the first of which is Middle Mission Isle, followed by the inhabited Home Island after . Numerous tiny, mostly elongated islands can be found on the lagoon side, never more than 350 metres (380 yards) from the coast. Probably the only house on the island is in the north. There is a campground to the west.

Since the Cocos Islands are usually included in Asia because they are significantly closer to the coast of Indonesia than Australia, and South Island is the southernmost island in the group, it is the southernmost island of Asia and its southernmost point at 12 ° 12 ′ 32 ″ S, 96 ° 53 ′ 42 ″ E is also the southernmost point of Eurasia. If the Cocos Islands are not included in Asia, the southernmost point is on the Indonesian island of Pamana,  farther north. If, however, the Australian Ashmore and Cartier Islands are also included in Asia, which are closer to Indonesia than to Asia, the southernmost point of Asia is  farther south, on Cartier Island. The northernmost point of mainland Australia, Cape York, is  farther south than South Island.

References

Islands of the Cocos (Keeling) Islands